is a Japanese component manufacturing company based in Tokyo, Japan. The company was founded in 1939 as a manufacturer of synthetic sapphire jewel bearings for electrical measuring instruments. Namiki supplies industrial jewel parts, dc coreless and dc brushless motors, multi-functional vibration components, precision  gearheads, medical equipment, watch exterior parts, and other precision components.
Namiki merged with its affiliated company, Adamant Co., Ltd. on January 1, 2018 and changed its name to Adamant Namiki Precision Jewel Co., Ltd.

Products

Jewel Parts 
Namiki supplies industrial jewel parts such as jewel bearings, diamond cantilevers, watch exterior parts, and sapphire wafers which are made of synthetic sapphire which is produced in-house. They have developed sapphire step wafers, with a step height of 0.22 nanometres, which are expected to become the height standard for scanning probe microscopy (SPM), plus Immobilization plates for observing bio-materials.

DC Motors 
Namiki supplies DC coreless motors, DC brushless motors and geared motors. In 2004, they developed the world's smallest micro geared motor (diameter 1.5mm) for use in medical equipment, (catheters, endoscopes) and Micro-robots.

Diaphragm Pumps 
Namiki supplies diaphragm liquid and air pumps used in inkjet printers and biotechnology devices including incubation systems.

Vibration Components
Namiki vibration motors and multi-functional vibration speakers combining speaker, receiver, and vibration functions, are used in mobile phones.

References

External links 
Namiki Precision Jewel Co., Ltd.
Namiki Precision of Singapore Pte Ltd.
Adamant Co., Ltd

Manufacturing companies based in Tokyo
Japanese companies established in 1953